SS Celtic was an ocean liner built for the White Star Line by shipbuilders Harland and Wolff of Belfast.

The Celtic (later the Amerika), the first of two White Star ships to bear the name, was the second of two Oceanic-class liners commissioned by White Star, following the success of their first four steamships (the Adriatic being the earlier of the new pair). The new ship was originally proposed to be named Arctic, but as the American Collins Line had a paddle-wheel steamer with that name (it sank in 1854) the White Star managers changed their minds, and settled on the name Celtic.

Celtic was one of six liners built for White Star to allow the line to operate a mail service across the Atlantic. (As the ships had a five week turnaround, five ships were needed to allow a weekly service, with the sixth ship acting as a spare). Celtic was a duplicate of Adriatic and like Adriatic, was larger than the first four ships. The ship had a Gross register tonnage of 3867 tons and a Net register tonnage of 2439 tons.

Celtic was built by Harland and Wolff at their Belfast shipyard, and was launched on 18 June 1872.

Celtic left Liverpool on her maiden voyage in October 1872. On 18 January 1873, Celtic struck floating wreckage in the Atlantic Ocean and lost her propeller blades. On 24 January 1877, Celtic rescued the survivors from the American schooner Island Belle, which resulted in Celtics  Commanding Officer, Benjamin Gleadell being thanked by the President of the United States, Ulysses S. Grant. In early 1879, Celtics propeller became detached from the driveshaft while at sea, and the ship made its way to Queenstown (now Cobh) in Ireland by sail.
 
In 1880, Edward Smith, who later became the Line's most celebrated Captain, and the Captain of the RMS Titanic, joined the crew of Celtic as her Fourth Officer.

In November 1881, Celtic again rescued a shipwrecked crew, this time of the Brigantine Alice.

The Celtic, with 870 passengers, had been steaming westbound for New York City, while the Britannic, carrying 450 passengers, was on the second day of her eastward journey to Liverpool. The two ships collided at almost right angles, with the Celtic burying her prow  in the aft port side of Britannic. The Celtic rebounded and hit two more times, before sliding past behind Britannic.

Six steerage passengers were killed outright on board Britannic, and another six were later found to be missing, having been washed overboard. There were no deaths on board Celtic. Both ships were badly damaged, but Britannic more so, having a large hole below her waterline. Fearing that she would founder, the passengers on board began to panic and rushed the lifeboats. Britannic captain, pistol in hand, was able to restore some semblance of order, and the boats were filled with women and children, although a few men forced their way on board. After the lifeboats had launched, it was realized that Britannic would be able to stay afloat, and the lifeboats within hailing distance were recalled. The rest made their way over to the Celtic. The two ships remained together through the night, and the next morning were joined by the Wilson Line's Marengo and the British Queen of the Inman Line, and the four slowly made their way into New York Harbor.

The Celtic was sold in 1893 to the Thingvalla Line. In 1898, the year that Thingvalla was absorbed into the Scandinavian America Line, the Amerika was scrapped.

Sources and references

Further reading

External links
Reprint of an article from Illustrated London News, 28 May 1887 of the collision
Info from The Ships List
Thingvalla info
E. Smith info source
 News report on the collision between Celtic and Britannic (New York Tribune May 23, 1887)

Victorian-era passenger ships of the United Kingdom
Ships built in Belfast
Ships of the White Star Line
1872 ships
Maritime incidents in January 1874
Maritime incidents in May 1887
Ships built by Harland and Wolff